Peter McCall (11 September 1936 – 9 February 2020) was an English footballer who played as a wing half in the Football League.

References

External links
Peter McCall's Career

1936 births
2020 deaths
English footballers
Footballers from West Ham
Association football midfielders
King's Lynn F.C. players
Bristol City F.C. players
Oldham Athletic A.F.C. players
Hereford United F.C. players
English Football League players